Riley Township is one of the fifteen townships of Putnam County, Ohio, United States.  The 2000 census found 2,191 people in the township, 1,003 of whom lived in the unincorporated portions of the township.

Geography
Located in the southeastern corner of the county, it borders the following townships:
Blanchard Township - north
Blanchard Township, Hancock County - northeast corner
Union Township, Hancock County - east
Richland Township, Allen County - south
Pleasant Township - west
Ottawa Township - northwest corner

The village of Pandora is located in central Riley Township.

Name and history
Riley Township was established in 1834. This township took its name from Riley Creek. Statewide, the only other Riley Township is located in Sandusky County.

Government
The township is governed by a three-member board of trustees, who are elected in November of odd-numbered years to a four-year term beginning on the following January 1. Two are elected in the year after the presidential election and one is elected in the year before it. There is also an elected township fiscal officer, who serves a four-year term beginning on April 1 of the year after the election, which is held in November of the year before the presidential election. Vacancies in the fiscal officership or on the board of trustees are filled by the remaining trustees.

References

External links
County website

Townships in Putnam County, Ohio
Townships in Ohio